Kolja Blacher (born 1963) is a German violin player. He plays the 1730 "Tritton" Stradivarius.

Aged 15, Blacher won the Jugend musiziert competition and studied violin with Dorothy DeLay at Juilliard in New York City. He then continued his studies with Sándor Végh. He was first concertmaster of the Berlin Philharmonic under Claudio Abbado from 1993 to 1999, and later at the Lucerne Festival Orchestra.

Blacher performed as a soloist with orchestras such as Berlin Philharmonic, Munich Philharmonic, NDR Symphony Orchestra, Leipzig Gewandhaus Orchestra, Orchestra di Santa Cecilia and Baltimore Symphony Orchestra. He has worked with conductors including Kirill Petrenko, Vladimir Jurowski, Dmitri Kitayenko, Mariss Jansons, Matthias Pintscher, Markus Stenz.

References

External links
 
 "Melbourne Symphony Orchestra review: Kolja Blacher plays it straight" by Clive O'Connell, The Sydney Morning Herald, 27 November 2015

1963 births
Living people
Musicians from Berlin
Juilliard School alumni
German classical violinists
21st-century classical violinists